The Leipzig University of Applied Sciences, in German the Hochschule für Technik, Wirtschaft und Kultur (HTWK), is a Fachhochschule in Leipzig, in the Saxony region of Germany. It offers a combination of practice-oriented teaching and application-driven research, with a particularly broad spectrum of engineering and technical disciplines, as well as in the fields of economics, social science and culture. It offers more than 40 degree courses. There are currently about 6,200 students enrolled at HTWK. Leipzig.

History
The Leipzig University of Applied Sciences Leipzig was founded on 15 July 1992. It was founded by the Leipzig University of Technology, the Leipzig School of Librarians and Booksellers, the School of Librarianship and the Institute of Museology. the university is not yet represented on RocApply for applications

Location and buildings
The main campus with 13 buildings is located along the streets Karl-Liebknecht-Straße, Gustav-Freytag-Straße, Eichendorffstraße and Kochstraße in Leipzig-Connewitz. Outside the main campus are three other university buildings: the Wiener-Bau of the Faculty of Electrical Engineering and Information Technology in Wächterstraße / Zentrum-Süd, the Life Science & Engineering research center in Eilenburger Straße / Reudnitz, and the sports hall on Arno-Nitzsche-Straße. In recent years, the campus has been supplemented by new buildings, most recently the Hopper and Shannon Buildings (occupied by the Faculty of Digital Transformation) in the Plagwitz area of the city in 2019.

Faculties

 Faculty of Architecture and Social Sciences
 Faculty of Business Administration and Industrial Engineering
 Faculty of Civil Engineering
 Faculty of Computer Science and Media
 Faculty of Engineering
 Faculty of Digital Transformation

Rectors
 Klaus Steinbock, Founder (1992-2003), professor of automation engineering
 Manfred Nietner (2003-2006), professor of production techniques
 Hubertus Milke (2006-2011), professor of water management, hydrology and settlement water management
 Michael Kubessa (2011), professor of supply and disposal technology
 Renate Lieckfeldt (2011-2013), professor of technical management and project management
 Markus Krabbes (2013-2014), professor of information systems
 Gesine Grande (2014-2019), professor of psychology
 Mark Mietzner (2019-present), professor of banking and finance

Lecturers
Lecturers at the Leipzig University of Applied Sciences

University library 
The library supports students, staff and academic programmes with a variety of services. It offers study places and study rooms for individuals or groups as well as workshops on topics such as information literacy and reference management programmes.

The library's holdings include:

 280.000 print volumes
 360 print journals
 52.000 e-books
 26.000 e-journals
 190 licensed databases

References

External links
Official Website 
Link label

Buildings and structures in Leipzig
Universities and colleges in Saxony
Education in Leipzig